Philips Saeco S.p.A., or short Saeco, is an Italian manufacturer of manual, super-automatic and capsule espresso machines and other electrical goods with headquarters and factories in Gaggio Montano near Bologna.

History
The company was founded by Sergio Zappella and Arthur Schmed in 1981 as Sergio, Arthur e Compagnia.

In 1985 they launched the first completely automatic espresso machine for domestic use, called Superautomatica and in 1999 they bought the historic espresso brand of Gaggia.

In May 2009, the company board agreed to a purchase offer from Dutch manufacturer Philips, owner of the Senseo coffee system, subject to shareholder and bank approval.

Other relevant contributions to the technology used in espresso machines include the cappuccinatore (introduced in 1996) as well as the automatic brewing pressure adaption "SBS" (1999)  and most recently, the announcement of the bluetooth-enabled GranBaristo Avanti (2013).

The Saeco brand belongs to the Dutch electronics company Philips since July 2009.
In 2017 Philips sold the Saeco Professional division (also with the Gaggia brand) to N&W Global Vending SpA, an Italian Bergamo based company leader in vending machines for drinks and snacks, born in 2000 from the integration of Necta and Wittenberg and controlled by a US fund, Lone Star. The production of professional coffee machines is carried out in the historical site of Gaggio Montano near Bologna. The domestic coffee machine division remains in the Philips group. In November 2017 N&W changes its name to Evoca Group.

See also 

 Bialetti
 De'Longhi
 Cimbali
 Elektra (espresso machines)
 Faema
 FrancisFrancis
 Gaggia
 La Marzocco
 Rancilio
 List of Italian companies

References

External links

Official website Philips-Saeco
Official website Saeco Professional

 
Philips
Coffee appliance vendors
Espresso machines
Home appliance brands
Home appliance manufacturers of Italy
Companies established in 1981
Italian brands
Italian companies established in 1981
Coffee in Italy
2009 mergers and acquisitions
Multinational companies headquartered in Italy